Wine lactone is a pleasant smelling compound found naturally in apples, orange juice, grapefruit juice, orange essential oil, clementine peel oil and various grape wines. It was first discovered as an essential oil metabolite in koala urine by Southwell in 1975. It was discovered several years later by Guth in white wines and was named "wine lactone". This monoterpene imparts "coconut, woody and sweet" odors to a wine. There are 8 possible isomers of wine lactone with the (3S, 3a S, 7aR) isomer being the only one that has been found in wine. This isomer is also the most potent of all eight with an odor detection threshold of 10 ng/L in model wine.

The odor threshold of the (3S,3aS,7aR)-wine lactone stereoisomer is 0.00001-0.00004 ng/L in air.

References

External links 
 Leffingwell website lists a number of wine lactone variants, notably the 0.00001-0.00004 ng/L version with animated structures

Food additives
Gamma-lactones
Wine chemistry
Monoterpenes
Sweet-smelling chemicals